Richie Ross (born August 28, 1982) is a former American football wide receiver. He was originally signed by the Houston Texans as an undrafted free agent in 2006. He played division II college football at the University of Nebraska at Kearney for the Lopers.

Professional career
He was originally signed by the Houston Texans on May 2, 2006 and was then released by Houston on September 1, 2006. On November 16, 2006, Ross was signed to the practice squad for the Titans. Richie was re-signed to the active roster of the Titans on January 11, 2007 and was waived a little more than a year later on February 13, 2008.

External links
Tennessee Titans bio

1982 births
Living people
Sportspeople from Lincoln, Nebraska
Players of American football from Nebraska
American football wide receivers
Nebraska–Kearney Lopers football players
Houston Texans players
Tennessee Titans players
Omaha Beef players
Nebraska Danger players